Daisy Rock Girl Guitars is a guitar company founded in 2000 by Tish Ciravolo. The company, currently a subsidiary of KMC Music, produces electric and acoustic guitars, bass guitars and ukuleles.

History 
Tish Ciravolo credits her oldest daughter Nicole for inspiring her to create Daisy Rock Girl Guitars. When Nicole was one-and-a-half years old, she drew a picture of a daisy while coloring with her mother.  Tish was inspired to draw a guitar neck and headstock on the picture. She developed the design and took it to her husband, Michael Ciravolo, the President of Schecter Guitar Research. (Schecter had grown, under Michael’s leadership, from its original roots as a small instrument parts company in the 1970s and 1980s into a major guitar manufacturer. Early Schecter endorsees included Michael’s old friend Robert De Leo from Stone Temple Pilots, as well as artists like Prince.)

The resulting first model, the "Daisy" guitar, debuted in November 2000 at Seattle's ROCKRGRL music conference. During the conference, musician Courtney Love saw the guitar and liked it so much she graciously gave her stamp of approval with an autograph.  In 2006, the Courtney Love signed Daisy Rock Guitar was inducted into the NAMM Museum of Making Music along with Tish Ciravolo and the original drawings by Nicole Ciravolo.

Daisy Rock Guitars entered into a partnership and under this agreement, Alfred Publishing became the co-owner and distributor of Daisy Rock Girl Guitars.  Sales in 2003 grew 150%, surpassing the $1 million mark. In 2004, sales doubled again, surpassing the $2 million mark. Daisy Rock Guitars and Alfred Publishing terminated their partnership in 2016. That same year, Daisy Rock Girl signed an agreement with KMC Music, a company belonging to corporate group Jam Industries. Under the terms of the agreement, KMC committed to distribute Daisy Rock products not only in the US but worldwide.

References

External links
 Official website

Guitar manufacturing companies of the United States
Musical instrument manufacturing companies based in Los Angeles
2000 establishments in California